C. greggii may refer to:

Ceanothus greggii
Colubrina greggii

See also
 Greggii